Glen is a town in Alcorn County, Mississippi. The population was 382 at the 2020 census, down from 412 at the 2010 census.

History 
Glen was originally called "Glendale" and is marked as such on old railroad maps.

Geography
Glen is located at  (34.859967, -88.418633).

Demographics

As of the census of 2000, there were 286 people, 121 households, and 87 families residing in the town. The population density was 61.1 people per square mile (23.6/km2). There were 133 housing units at an average density of 28.4 per square mile (11.0/km2). The racial makeup of the town was 99.65% White, and 0.35% from two or more races. Hispanic or Latino of any race were 0.70% of the population.

There were 121 households, out of which 28.9% had children under the age of 18 living with them, 62.8% were married couples living together, 6.6% had a female householder with no husband present, and 27.3% were non-families. 26.4% of all households were made up of individuals, and 10.7% had someone living alone who was 65 years of age or older. The average household size was 2.36 and the average family size was 2.86.

In the town, the population was spread out, with 22.4% under the age of 18, 7.3% from 18 to 24, 27.6% from 25 to 44, 25.2% from 45 to 64, and 17.5% who were 65 years of age or older. The median age was 39 years. For every 100 females, there were 115.0 males. For every 100 females age 18 and over, there were 113.5 males.

The median income for a household in the town was $26,964, and the median income for a family was $27,813. Males had a median income of $27,083 versus $21,667 for females. The per capita income for the town was $14,541. About 7.1% of families and 10.4% of the population were below the poverty line, including 12.5% of those under the age of eighteen and 15.2% of those 65 or over.

Places of interest 
 Corinth City Water Treatment Plant
 Kingsford Charcoal Plant

Education

Public schools
The town of Glen is served by the Alcorn School District.
 Alcorn Central High School is the public high school in Glen and serves grades 9–12. The school colors are purple and gold
 and the mascot is a bear. Alcorn Central has about 420 students. Alcorn Central High School is at 8 Cr 254 City. Dakota Howse is the school's athletic director.

Sports
Boys sports include:
Baseball
Basketball
Football
Soccer
Tennis

Girls sports:
Basketball
Soccer
Softball
Tennis
Volleyball
 Alcorn Central Middle School - grades 5–8 with an enrollment of 514 students
 Alcorn Central Elementary School - grades K-4 with an enrollment of 508 students
 Glendale Elementary - grades K-6 with an estimated enrollment of 175 students.

Transportation

Highways
 U.S. Route 72

Media

FM radio stations
 WTRR-LP 97.1 - owned by Write to Read Radio, Inc.

References

 Brieger, James. Hometown, Mississippi. (1997). 

Towns in Alcorn County, Mississippi
Towns in Mississippi